The 1989–90 Norwegian 1. Divisjon season was the 51st season of ice hockey in Norway. Ten teams participated in the league, and Furuset IF won the championship.

Regular season

Playoffs

External links 
 Norwegian Ice Hockey Federation

Nor
1989-90 
GET